Muhammad Agung Pribadi (born 23 July 1989) is an Indonesian professional footballer who plays as a defensive midfielder or right-back for Liga 2 club Bekasi City. He had previously played for Persib Bandung U-21, and won the Indonesia Super League U-21 with the club in 2009.

Club career

Early career
He joined and rose through the junior team of hometown club Persib Bandung from 2004 until 2010. He was part of the team that won the 2009-10 Indonesia Super League U-21 and as third place in the 2008–09 Indonesia Super League U-21.

Persib Bandung
He was promoted to the senior squad in 2010. He made his first-team debut for Persib Bandung when he was part of the starting lineup of a 2010–11 Indonesia Super League match against Sriwijaya on 2 January 2011, in which Persib lose.

On 28 November 2014, he signed a new one-year contract until the end of 2015. In the 2014 Indonesia Super League, he helped Persib to the championship, although he not play in the final against Persipura Jayapura.

Persela Lamongan (loan)
In the 2016 Indonesia Soccer Championship A, in the competition second round, He was loaned to Persela Lamongan from Persib Bandung. In the 2017 Liga 1 season, he returned to Persela on loan for the second time.

He made his official league debut for Persela Lamongan when he was part of the starting lineup of a 2017 Liga 1 match against Badak Lampung on 13 May 2017, in which Persela draw.

PSIM Yogyakarta
In 2019, Agung Pribadi signed a contract with Indonesian Liga 2 club PSIM Yogyakarta.

PSKC Cimahi
He was signed for PSKC Cimahi to play in Liga 2 in the 2020 season. This season was suspended on 27 March 2020 due to the COVID-19 pandemic. The season was abandoned and was declared void on 20 January 2021.

RANS Cilegon
He was signed for RANS Cilegon to play in the second round of Liga 2 in the 2021 season. Agung Pribadi made his debut on 15 December 2021 in a match against Persis Solo at the Pakansari Stadium, Cibinong.

Bekasi City
On 6 June 2022, it was announced that Agung Pribadi would be joining Bekasi City for the 2022-23 Liga 2 campaign.

Honours

Club
Persib Bandung U-21
Indonesia Super League U-21: 2009–10

Persib Bandung
 Indonesia Super League: 2014
 Indonesia President's Cup: 2015

RANS Cilegon
 Liga 2 runner-up: 2021

References

External links
 

1989 births
Living people
Sportspeople from Bandung
Indonesian footballers
Liga 1 (Indonesia) players
Persib Bandung players
Persela Lamongan players
PSIM Yogyakarta players
Liga 2 (Indonesia) players
Association football defenders
21st-century Indonesian people